Heinz Sablan Hofschneider (born July 1, 1957) is a politician from the Northern Mariana Islands. Hofschneider served as the Speaker of the Northern Mariana Islands House of Representatives from 2002 to 2004 and is a four-time candidate for Governor of the Northern Mariana Islands.

Early life and career
Heinz Sablan Hofschneider was born July 1, 1957 in Saipan to William  Villagomez  Hofschneider and Primitiba Roberto Sablan. He attended Menlo College in Atherton, California for two years. Due to the cost, he transferred to California State University at Los Angeles. At Cal State, he majored in health sciences then worked as a physician assistant.

Commonwealth Legislature
Hofschneider was first elected to the Northern Mariana Islands House of Representatives in the 1991 general election. He finished second for six seats in the third district. Later that year, after Governor Larry Guerrero purchased a $5 million generator from Mitsubishi without a budget appropriation, Hofschneider was one of three legislators to speak of impeaching the Governor. Subsequently, his home was attacked in a drive-by shooting. After the House dropped the impeachment inquiry one month after the shooting, Hofschneider attempted an audit of Mitsubishi. The audit revealed Guerrero misappropriated funds.

In 1993, Hofschneider was re-elected as an independent after being dropped from the Republican ticket in light of his criticism of Guerrero. He finished in first place in the district

In 2000, Hofschneider was running against Benigno Fitial for the position of Speaker. During the election, Jack Abramoff sent two operatives to the islands to lobby legislators on Fitial's behalf. Fitial was subsequently reelected as Speaker and Abramoff's contract was extended.

In the 2018 general election, Hofschneider ran as an independent for the Northern Mariana Islands Senate in the 3rd senatorial district. He ran as an ally of the gubernatorial ticket of Juan Babauta and Rita Aldan Sablan. Hofschneider received 3,813 votes and finished fourth of five candidates for two seats.

Runs for Governor
Hofschneider was a gubernatorial candidate in the 2001, 2005, 2009, and 2014 elections. 

In the 2005 gubernatorial election, Hofschneider ran on a ticket with David M. Apatang. While both Hofschneider and Apatang were Republicans, they ran as independents. The 2005 election was particularly bitter as families faced divided loyalties and a record amount of money was raised and spent on attack ads. In a four-way race, the HofschneiderApatang ticket lost to Benigno Fitial and Timothy Villagomez of the Covenant Party by a single point.

His best gubernatorial election result came in 2009, when he was the Republican nominee for Governor of the Northern Mariana Islands in the 2009 gubernatorial election. Representative Arnold I. Palacios of Saipan, the Speaker of the House then, was Hofschneider's running mate for lieutenant governor. Hofschneider won the initial popular vote but failed to gain a majority, triggering a runoff against the incumbent, Benigno Fitial. Fitial won the runoff by 370 votes and therefore was re-elected.

Hofschneider ran a fourth time for governor in 2014 as an independent. His running mate was independent Senator Ray Yumul of Saipan. Hofschnedier lost to the incumbent, Eloy Inos.

Hofschneider's wife is Susan Sablan Hofschneider and they have two children. Hofschneider represented Election District 3 in the House, which encompasses portions of Saipan and the Northern Islands.

References

External links
Heinz Hofschneider campaign

1957 births
Chamorro people
Living people
Members of the Northern Mariana Islands House of Representatives
People from Saipan
Republican Party (Northern Mariana Islands) politicians
Speakers of the Northern Mariana Islands House of Representatives